Ewing is an unincorporated community in Washington Township, Hocking County, Ohio, United States.

History
Ewing was laid out in 1850. A first post office was established at Ewing in 1850.

References

Populated places in Hocking County, Ohio